Khazanchi Ki Beti is a Bollywood film. It was released in 1943.

References

External links
 

1943 films
1940s Hindi-language films
Indian action comedy films
Indian black-and-white films
1940s action comedy films
1943 comedy films